The 1999–2000 Latvian Hockey League season was the ninth season of the Latvian Hockey League, the top level of ice hockey in Latvia. Six teams participated in the league, and HK Liepājas Metalurgs won the championship. HK Liepājas Metalurgs received a bye until the final, as they played in the Eastern European Hockey League.

First round

Final round

External links
 Season on hockeyarchives.info

Latvian Hockey League
Latvian Hockey League seasons
Latvian